Quern-stones are stone tools for hand-grinding a wide variety of materials. They are used in pairs. The lower stationary stone of early examples is called a saddle quern, while the upper mobile stone is called a muller, rubber or handstone. The upper stone was moved in a back-and-forth motion across the saddle quern. Later querns are known as rotary querns. The central hole of a rotary quern is called the eye, and a dish in the upper surface is known as the hopper. A handle slot contained a handle which enabled the rotary quern to be rotated. They were first used in the Neolithic era to grind cereals into flour.

Uses of quern-stones
An old Gaelic proverb is "The quern performs best when the grindstone has been pitted."

Design of quern-stones
The upper stones were usually concave while the lower ones were convex. Quern-stones are frequently identifiable by their grooved working surfaces which enabled the movement of flour. Sometimes a millrind was present as a piece of wood (or other material), which allowed the cereal etc. to be added but still acted as a centering device. The upper stone sometimes had a cup-shaped area around the hopper hole with a raised edge. Most handstones have a handle hole on the upper surface, but one class of quern-stones have a slot handle which indicates that a piece of wood was placed horizontally and protruded out from the edge so that the operator could turn the stone by standing and using a rod vertically. One class of upper quern-stones has from two to three sockets for the rod used to turn them and this is thought to reflect the need to reduce wear and tear by having alternative points of contact when in active use.

Grain

Quern-stones have been used by numerous civilizations throughout the world to grind materials, the most important of which was usually grain to make flour for bread-making. They were generally replaced by millstones once mechanised forms of milling appeared, particularly the water mill and the windmill, although animals were also used to operate the millstones. However, in many non-Westernised, non-mechanised cultures they are still manufactured and used regularly and have only been replaced in many parts of the world in the last century or so.

The use of grinding stones for vegetal food processing, and possibly the production of flour, was widespread across Europe from at least 30,000 years ago.

In early Maya civilizations the process of nixtamalization was distinctive in that hard, ripe kernels of maize (corn) were boiled in water and lime, thus producing nixtamal which was then made into unleavened dough for flat cakes by grinding with a handstone on a quern (metate).

Quern stones were used in China at least 10,000 years ago to grind wheat into flour. The production of flour by rubbing wheat by hand took several hours. Due to their form, dimensions, and the nature of the treatment of the surfaces, they reproduce precisely the most ancient implements used for grinding cereal grain into flour. Saddle querns were known in China during the Neolithic Age but rotary stone mills did not appear until the Warring States Period. A prehistoric quern dating back to 23,000 BCE was found at the Longwangchan archaeological site, in Hukou, Shaanxi in 2007. The site is located in the heartland of the northern Chinese loess plateau near the Yellow River.

Other materials
As well as grain, ethnographic evidence and Mesopotamian texts show that a wide range of foodstuffs and inorganic materials were processed using stone querns or mortars, including nuts, seeds, fruit, vegetables, herbs, spices, meat, bark, pigments, temper and clay. Moreover, one study analysing quern-stones noted that a number of querns had traces of arsenic and bismuth, unlike their source rocks, and had levels of antimony which were ten times higher than those of the rocks. The authors concluded that this was probably due to the use of these querns in the preparation of medicines, cosmetics, dyes or even in the manufacture of alloys.

Querns were widely used in grinding metals ores after mining extraction. The aim was to liberate fine ore particles which could then be separated by washing for example, prior to smelting. They were thus widely used in gold mining in antiquity.

In Shetland, tobacco was not smoked when first introduced, but instead was ground up into snuff, and inhaled up the nose. Snuff-querns consisted of an upper and lower stone, fixed together by a central iron pivot. The quern was held on the user's lap, the eye of the quern was filled with dried tobacco leaves, and then the upper-stone was turned using the handle. The friction caused by the turning ground the leaves into a fine powder that built up around the edge of the lower-stone. Many snuff-querns had a small hole or cut made near the edge of the upper-stone, into which a pointed end of a lamb's horn was placed in order to turn the stone; an alternative to using a handle.

Incidental uses

There are, however, more surprising recorded uses of quern-stones. For example, DeBoer, in his review of the traditional gambling games of North American tribes, reports that one of the games involved bouncing a group of split canes off a quern.

Violence is recorded thus in the Old Testament in the Book of Judges (9:53; NRSV): "But a certain woman threw an upper-millstone on Abimelech's head, and crushed his skull."

Manufacture of quern-stones
The best type of stone from which to manufacture quern-stones are igneous rocks such as basalt. These have naturally rough surfaces, but grains do not detach easily, so the material being ground does not become gritty. However, such rocks are not always available, meaning that quern-stones have been manufactured from a wide variety of rocks, including sandstone, quartzite and limestone. Quernmore Crag near Lancaster in England is named after the quarrying of millstone grit used to make quern stones in these parts. The names of the mountains of Whernside and Great Whernside in the Yorkshire Dales have the same origin.

Rutter was able to show, for the southern Levant, that basalt quern-stones were preferred to those manufactured from other rock types. Basalt quern-stones were therefore transported over long-distances, leading him to argue that, despite their everyday, utilitarian function, they were also used as a status symbol.

Research in Scotland has indicated that to a degree regional styles existed.

Evolution of quern-stones
Knocking stones were used in the preparation of small quantities of cereal, however the earliest forms of quern were the saddle and trough querns. The earliest quern so far discovered dates to c. 9,000 BCE and was found at Abu Hureyra, Syria. A later development was the rotary quern, which takes several forms.

Saddle quern
The saddle quern is produced by rocking or rolling the muller using parallel motions (i.e., pushing and pulling the handstone), which forms a shape looking like a saddle. These are the most ancient and widely used type of quern-stone and were superseded around the 5th to the 4th century BC by the more efficient rotary quern. The handstones for saddle querns are generally either roughly cylindrical (not unlike a rolling pin) and used with both hands, or rough hemispheres and used with one hand. This provides a crushing motion, not a grinding action and is more suitable for crushing malted grain. It is not easy to produce flour from a saddle quern with unmalted grain. The muller is also referred to as a 'rubber' or 'mouler'. Some pictorial examples may be found in the metate article.

Rotary quern

As the name implies, the rotary quern used circular motions to grind the material, meaning both the upper and lower quern were generally circular. The handstone of a rotary quern is much heavier than that of saddle quern and provides the necessary weight for the grinding of unmalted grain into flour. In some cases the grinding surfaces of the stones fit into each other, the upper stone being slightly concave and the lower one convex.

Beehive quern

In this type, the upper stone is hemispherical, or bun-shaped, with a central conical hopper to hold the grain that falls down a hole to the grinding surface. It is held in position with a pivot that fits into a central hole in the bottom stone. The upper stone also has a deep horizontal socket in its steep side in which to place the wooden peg used as a handle to rotate or oscillate the upper stone. This was the earliest type of rotary quern to appear in the British Isles. It arrived in Britain in the middle of the Iron Age (about 400–300 BC) and spread into the northern half of Ireland, probably from Scotland, some time after the 2nd century BC.

Disc quern

Disc querns consist of two flat disc-shaped stones, an upper stone with a cylindrical perforation for containing a handle and a lower stone with a central spindle hole. The adjustable, discoid rotary quern has larger, flatter and more discoid stones than the beehive type. The lower stone was completely perforated. The long handle rotated in a shallow socket in the upper surface of the upper stone. They are thought to have originated in Spain 2,500 years ago and appear to have arrived in maritime Scotland from about 200 BC with people who built the defensive homes known as brochs. This Iron Age type closely resembles the adjustable Highland quern still in use in historic times. In Ireland, disc querns were the dominant type of querns in use between the years 500 CE–1500 CE, and usually had a diameter of 30–60 cm.

Garnett in his 1800 tour of Scotland describes the use of a hand quern as follows:

Miniature quern
Under  in diameter and varying from roughly dressed to carefully worked, often with vertical handle sockets, a new class of querns has been identified having been overlooked in the past as weights, etc. In all respects they are like full sized quern stones and they show the typical wear signs that indicate that they were used for grinding small amounts of seeds, minerals or herbs. A suggestion that they may have been made as toys is thought to be unlikely.

Other types of quern stones
Other forms of quern-stone include hopper-rubbers and Pompeian mills, both used by the Romans. The larger rotary mills were usually worked by a donkey or horse via an extension arm of wood attached to the upper stone.

Querns utilizing crank-and-connecting rods were used in the Western Han Dynasty.

Laws against use
There was a legal requirement in Scotland for tenants to pay for use of the baron's mill. Early leases of mills gave to the miller the legal right to destroy quern-stones which were being used in defiance of thirlage agreements.

The obligations of thirlage eventually ceased to apply, but thirlage in Scotland was only formally and totally abolished on 28 November (Martinmas) 2004 by the Abolition of Feudal Tenure etc. (Scotland) Act 2000.

Similar requirements existed and were enforced actively in England.

Ornament and inscription

A number of handstones have been found with extra carving, however it is not always straightforward to separate decoration from practical functional purposes. The designs invest in the appearance of the handstone when it is in circular motion, and the ability of the quern-stones to change seeds into flour may invoke a feeling of transformative magic that attracted both reverence and status to these household objects. Three beehive querns found in Ireland have inscribed ornament of La Tène type, as do examples from England and Wales. Many of the horizontal slot-handled quern-stones have decoration that usually follows the basic pattern of motifs that encircle the hopper and/or the handle slot. One type though has an irregular pattern of cup marks that encircle the hopper.

A quern was discovered at Dunadd in Scotland that has a cross carved into the upper stone. The cross has expanded terminals and ultimately derives its form from Roman and Byzantine predecessors of the fifth and sixth centuries. This example has a high quality of finishing which reflects its 'cost' and enhances its symbolic value and social significance. The cross is likely to have 'protected' the corn and the resultant flour from evil, such as fungal rust or ergot. Various legends give miraculous power to mill-stones and several have been found which have been re-used in the construction of burial cists or as tomb stones. The association between quern stones and burial may be because they are used in the process of making bread, the staple of life. A broken or disused quern therefore can be seen as symbolic of death.<ref name="Campbell">Ewan Campbell, A cross-marked quern from Dunadd and other evidence for relations between Dunass and Iona, 'Proceedings of the Society of Antiquaries of Scotland, vol. 5, no. 117 (1987), pp. 105 - 117.</ref> In Clonmacnoise, near Athlone in County Offaly in Ireland, a quern stone was found which had been made into a tombstone, having been ornamented and the name Sechnasach, who died in 928 AD, inscribed onto it. A large quern was discovered on the Lough Scur crannog in Ireland.

The Wondrous Mauchline Quern
In the 9th century the Welsh monk Nennius wrote a history of Britain, the Historia Brittonum, in which he lists the thirteen wonders of Britain, and included in it is the wondrous 'Mauchline Quern' that ground constantly, except on Sundays. It could be heard working underground and the local placename 'Auchenbrain' may celebrate it, translating from the Gaelic as 'field of the quern.

Related grinding tools
Knocking stone
Jato: a type of rotary quern-stone used in the Himalayan region of Nepal, Sikkim, Darjeeling and Bhutan.
 (Malay)
Manos and metate
Millstone

See also

 Metate
Scottish Rural Life, History Dictionary
Sharpening stone

Notes

Bibliography
DeBoer, W. (2001) Of dice and women: gambling and exchange in Native North America, In Journal of Archaeological Method and Theory 8:215-268.
Gauldie, Enid (1981) The Scottish Miller 1700–1900. Pub. John Donald. . 98-99.
Lease, N., Laurent, R., Blackburn, M. and Fortin, M. (2001) Caractérisation pétrologie d’artefact en basalte provenant de Tell ‘Atij et de Tell Gudeda en Syrie de Nord (3000-2500 av J-C), In Serie archéométrie 1:227-240.

Wright, K. (1992) Ground stone assemblage variations and subsistence strategies in the Levant, 22,000 to 5,500 bp, unpublished PhD thesis, Yale University.

External links
Atlas of European millstone quarries
Saddle quern, other querns, and stone objects at the Khirbet Qeiyafa archaeological site in Israel
 Demonstration of quern-stone use in Iran, November 2022.

Archaeological artefact types
Articles containing video clips
Chinese inventions
Food grinding tools
Grinding and lapping
Grinding mills
Lithics
Maya civilization
Stone objects